= Amalapura =

Coordinates: 14°06′N 76°15′E

Amalpura is a village in the southern state of Karnataka, India.

== See also ==
- Bellary
- Districts of Karnataka
